Tsvetan Penchev (born 20 March 1953) is a Bulgarian sailor. He competed in the Tornado event at the 1980 Summer Olympics.

References

External links
 

1953 births
Living people
Bulgarian male sailors (sport)
Olympic sailors of Bulgaria
Sailors at the 1980 Summer Olympics – Tornado
Place of birth missing (living people)